The Johnny Cash Songbook is a compilation album released on Harmony Records in 1972. It contains 10 tracks, most of them from Cash's early Columbia days. This album peaked at #43 on the US charts.

Side one
"Don't Take Your Guns to Town"
"I Walk the Line"
"I'm Gonna Try to Be That Way"
"Five Feet High and Rising"
"I Promise You"

Side two
"Hey Porter"
"Give My Love to Rose"
"Big River"
"I Still Miss Someone"
"All of God's Children Ain't Free"

References

1972 compilation albums
Johnny Cash compilation albums
Harmony Records compilation albums